Bella Vista is a small town on the San Martin River in Bolivia. In 2010 it had an estimated population of 2541.

The town is served by Irobi Airport.

Location

References

Populated places in Beni Department